Figure skating at the 2017 Winter Universiade was held on February 1–5 at the Almaty Arena in Almaty, Kazakhstan. Medals were awarded in men's singles, ladies' singles, and ice dancing.

Regulations
Skaters who were born between 1 January 1989 and 31 December 1999 are eligible to compete at the Winter Universiade if they are registered as proceeding towards a degree or diploma at a university or similar institute, or obtained their academic degree or diploma in the year preceding the event. Each nation may send a maximum of three entries per discipline.

Medalists

Withdrawn events
On 17 January, it was announced the cancellation of pairs competition in the figure skating due to the low number of entrants. Only two pairs from Russia were registered in the event, which forced the cancellation of the same, according to the rules of FISU.

Medal table

Entries
Originally there were also a pairs' event but it was cancelled because it had only two entries, both Russian.

Results

Men

Ladies

Ice dance

References

External links
 2017 Winter Universiade at the International Skating Union
 Results book
 http://www.isuresults.com/results/season1617/wuni2017/wu2017/

 
2017 Winter Universiade
2017
2017 Winter Universiade
Winter Universiade